Pedley may refer to:

People
 Arthur Pedley (1859–1943), British civil servant
 Eric Leader Pedley (1896–1986), American polo player
 Ethel Pedley (1859–1898), Australian author and musician
 Jonathan Pedley (born 1962), British authority on wine
 Leslie Pedley (1930–2018), Australian botanist
 Nicholas Pedley (1615–1685), English politician
 Robin Pedley (1914-88), English educationist and comprehensive school pioneer
 Stephen Pedley (born 1940), British Anglican bishop
 Sue Pedley (born 1954), Australian multimedia artist
 Tim Pedley (born 1942), British mathematician
 William Pedley (1858–1920), British civil engineer and cricketer
 Andrew Pedley (Born 1982), Air Cadet squad leader in the North West of England and fundamental in forwarding alternate views on heat and helium.

Places
 Pedley, California
Pedley station
 Pedley Hills, California, United States